John Kean (December 4, 1852November 4, 1914) was an American attorney, banker and Republican Party politician from Elizabeth, New Jersey. He represented New Jersey in the U.S. Senate from 1899 to 1911 and served two separate terms in the United States House of Representatives, from 1883 to 1885, and from 1887 to 1889. A member of the Kean family of politicians, his great-grandfather, John Kean, had been a delegate to the Continental Congress for South Carolina, his brother was U.S. Senator Hamilton Fish Kean, his nephew was U.S. Representative Robert Kean and his great-nephew was Governor Thomas Kean.

Early life and education
Kean was born on December 4, 1852, at Liberty Hall at present-day Kean University, then called "Ursino", near Elizabeth, New Jersey. Kean was the son of Lucinetta "Lucy" (née Halstead) and John Kean. He was related to several prominent American politicians including his great-grandfather John Kean, and great-uncle Hamilton Fish. His younger brother was Hamilton Fish Kean.

He studied in private schools and attended Yale College. He graduated from Columbia Law School in New York City in 1875. He was admitted to the New Jersey bar in 1877, but did not engage in extensive practice.

Career
He worked in banking and manufacturing before entering politics. He was elected as a Republican to represent New Jersey's 3rd congressional district in the 48th United States Congress, serving from March 4, 1883, to March 3, 1885. He was an unsuccessful candidate for reelection in 1884.

He was later elected to the 50th United States Congress, serving from March 4, 1887, to March 3, 1889, when he was again an unsuccessful candidate for reelection in 1888. He was named Chairman of the New Jersey Republican State Committee in 1891, resigning the following year to run as the Republican candidate for Governor of New Jersey. He lost the 1892 gubernatorial race to Democrat George Theodore Werts. He was a member of the committee to revise the judiciary system of New Jersey.

He was elected to the United States Senate in 1899 and reelected in 1905, serving in the Senate from March 4, 1899, to March 3, 1911. He was chairman of the Committee on the Geological Survey (Fifty-seventh United States Congress) and Committee to Audit and Control the Contingent Expenses (Fifty-eighth United States Congress through Sixty-first United States Congress).

After politics, he re-engaged in banking in Elizabeth, New Jersey.

Personal life
He died at "Ursino" on November 4, 1914, after developing Bright's disease. Kean, who was one of nine children, did not marry, in fact, only two of his siblings, brother Hamilton Fish Kean, who married Katharine Taylor Winthrop, and sister Christine Griffin Kean, who married Emlen Roosevelt, married. He was interred in Evergreen Cemetery, in Hillside, New Jersey.

Legacy
Keansburg, New Jersey is named in honor of John Kean. In 1884, Kean played a key part in helping the town, at the time called Granville, to obtain its first post office. During that year, the name Keansburg was adopted.

References

External links

Biography from John Kean at the Political Graveyard

1852 births
1914 deaths
John
Republican Party United States senators from New Jersey
New Jersey lawyers
Politicians from Elizabeth, New Jersey
Columbia Law School alumni
Yale College alumni
Chairmen of the New Jersey Republican State Committee
Republican Party members of the United States House of Representatives from New Jersey
Burials at Evergreen Cemetery (Hillside, New Jersey)
19th-century American politicians